East Retford was a Municipal borough in Nottinghamshire, England from 1835 to 1974. It was formed under the Municipal Corporations Act 1835 from the Ancient Borough of East Retford.

The borough survived until 1974 when it was abolished under the Local Government Act 1972, forming part of the new Bassetlaw district of Nottinghamshire.

Borough Council

Wards
The Borough was divided into wards for electoral purposes. In 1920 they were:

East Ward
South Ward
West Ward

References
http://www.visionofbritain.org.uk/unit_page.jsp?u_id=10108962&c_id=10001043
http://www.genuki.org.uk/big/eng/NTT/EastRetford/
http://www.bassetlawjobs.co.uk/workinginbassetlaw/retford.aspx

Districts of England abolished by the Local Government Act 1972
Municipal boroughs of Nottinghamshire
Municipal Borough of